Another Music in a Different Kitchen is the first studio album by the English punk rock band Buzzcocks. It was released in March 1978 by the United Artists record label. This was the third line-up of Buzzcocks, with the guitarist Pete Shelley singing following the departure of the original vocalist Howard Devoto and then the firing of the bass guitarist Garth Smith (who had appeared on the "Orgasm Addict"/"Whatever Happened To...?" single). The album includes the single "I Don't Mind", which reached number 55 in the UK Singles Chart in May 1978.

Album title
The album's title was inspired by a collage by Linder Sterling. According to Shelley, "Howard said, 'another housewife stews in her own juice in a different kitchen'. We shuffled it around a bit and it came out like that."

Album cover
The sleeve design is by Malcolm Garrett. The original UK vinyl release was issued with a black cardboard inner sleeve, using a colour photo by Jill Furmanovsky on the front cover where Linder's image was intended to appear. Subsequent pressings substituted a black and white photo. The initial few thousand copies were shipped in a matching silver plastic shopping bag boldly with the word 'PRODUCT' on one side and the catalogue number "UAG 30159" on the other. Displaying the catalogue number prominently in this way was a common feature of Buzzcocks' artwork which was later picked up and taken to logical extremes by Factory Records where everything they produced was catalogued.

Composition 
The first pressing inadvertently gave a songwriting credit for "Fast Cars" to Shelley/Devoto due to it incorporating the riff from the song "Boredom" off the Spiral Scratch EP, though according to Steve Diggle he wrote ninety percent of the song, which was a personal song based on a car crash in which he was involved.

The album was originally conceived with the track "I Need" on side one, but after a test pressing was made, the group felt the song should appear on the second side. A mix-up occurred at the pressing plant and, as a consequence, some early copies of the album contained no "I Need" at all.

Release 

An undated songbook was published with sheet music from the album, band photos, brief biographical material and a discography which includes the band's second release, Love Bites. As such, it would have been released after 22 September 1978, the release date of Love Bites. In keeping with other releases, the line "Agreed Images", which is a credit for the designer Malcolm Garrett / Assorted iMaGes, appears on the back cover below the stocking number.

A blue vinyl version was re-released around 1986. The corresponding CD was released in March 1994 on the same record label, adding a second disc with "Orgasm Addict" and "What Do I Get?". EMI released a special edition (in 2008 in Europe, 2010 USA) with two CDs. Rhino Records re-released Another Music in a Different Kitchen in a limited edition of 6,200 copies on 180-gram translucent orange vinyl in 2015 for Black Friday Record Store Day.

Legacy 
The album's second track, "No Reply", was covered by SS Decontrol on their 1983 EP Get It Away. The influential Seattle band The Fastbacks recorded "Whatever Happened To...?" on their 1991 single "My Letters", released by Sub Pop. The track "Autonomy" was covered by the pop punk band The Offspring on the single "Want You Bad".

The Sub Pop act Love Battery were named after the song of that name on this album.

Another Music in a Different Kitchen was included in the book 1001 Albums You Must Hear Before You Die. In a retrospective review for BBC Music, the critic David Quantick named it as his favourite album of all time and wrote, "Everything about it – from its silver, orange-lettered sleeve to Martin Rushent's aluminium-sheen production – is right."

Track listing

Personnel 
Buzzcocks
 Pete Shelley – lead guitar, lead vocals
 Steve Diggle – rhythm guitar, backing vocals
 Steve Garvey – bass guitar
 John Maher – drums, percussion
Garth Smith (bass guitar) on Peel Session September 1977, most of the demo recordings and live at the Electric Circus 2 October 1977

Technical
 Martin Rushent – producer
 Doug Bennet – engineer
 Malcolm Garrett – sleeve design

References

External links 
 

Buzzcocks albums
1978 debut albums
Albums produced by Martin Rushent
I.R.S. Records albums
Nettwerk Records albums
Parlophone albums
United Artists Records albums
Albums recorded at Olympic Sound Studios